Michael Dennis Burke  (born July 28, 1950) is a retired United States professional American-football punter who played 1 season in the National Football League with the Los Angeles Rams in 1974. He played college football for Oregon State and University of Miami.

References

1950 births
Living people
American football punters
Oregon State Beavers football players
Miami Hurricanes football players
Los Angeles Rams players
People from Pleasanton, California